A New Testament Lectionary is a handwritten copy of a lectionary, or book of New Testament Bible readings. Lectionaries may be written in majuscule or minuscule Greek letters, on parchment, papyrus, vellum, or paper.

New Testament lectionaries are distinct from: 
 New Testament papyri
 New Testament majuscules 
 New Testament minuscules

Lectionaries which have the Gospels readings are called Evangeliaria or Evangelistaria, those which have the Acts or Epistles, Apostoli or Praxapostoli. They appear from the 6th century.

Before Scholz only 57 Gospel lectionaries and 20 Apostoloi were known. Scholz added to the list 58-181 Evangelistarioi and 21-58 Apostoloi. Gregory in 1909 enumerated 2234 lectionaries. To the present day 2484 lectionary manuscripts have been catalogued by the (INTF) in Münster.

Legend 
 The numbers (#) are the now standard system of Caspar René Gregory (Gregory–Aland). 
 Dates are estimated to the nearest century (except lectionaries dated by scribes which are shown in the Date column). 
 Content only the Gospel lessons (Evangelistarion), and other lessons from the rest of the NT apart from Revelation (Apostolos). Sometimes the surviving portion of a codex is so limited that specific books, chapters or even verses can be indicated. Linked articles, where they exist, generally specify content in detail, by verse.
 Digital images are referenced with direct links to the hosting web pages. The quality and accessibility of the images is as follows:

Contents Legend:
† Indicates the manuscript has damaged or missing pages.
P Indicates only a portion of the original book remains. 
K Indicates manuscript also includes commentary notes.
sel Indicates contents include Scripture readings for selected days only.
e Indicates contents include weekday Scripture readings.
esk Indicates contents include weekday Scripture readings from Easter to Pentecost and Saturday/Sunday readings for other weeks.
sk Indicates contents include only Saturday and Sunday Scripture readings.
Lit Indicates Liturgical book containing an assortment of New Testament texts.
PsO Indicates a Psalter with Biblical Odes.
[ ] Brackets around Gregory-Aland number indicate the number is no longer is use.

Script Legend:
ΑΩ indicates Majuscule script
αω indicates Minuscule script
PU indicates manuscript is a palimpsest and script is the text under the later script.
PO indicates manuscript is a palimpsest and script is the text over the prior script.

List of named or notable lectionaries

Lectionaries 2001–2100

Lectionaries 2101–2200

Lectionaries 2201–2300

Lectionaries 2301–2400

Lectionaries 2401–2486

Gallery

Uncial Lectionaries

Minuscule Lectionaries

See also 

 Lists 
 Categories of New Testament manuscripts
 Lists of New Testament manuscripts 
 List of New Testament papyri 
 List of New Testament uncials 
 List of New Testament minuscules 
 List of New Testament Latin manuscripts 
 List of New Testament amulets

 Articles 
 Novum Testamentum Graece 
 Biblical manuscript 
 Palaeography 
 Textual criticism

References

Bibliography 
 Dr. Peter M. Head. The Early Greek Bible Manuscript Project: New Testament Lectionary Manuscripts. 
 K. Aland, M. Welte, B. Köster, K. Junack, Kurzgefasste Liste der griechischen Handschriften des Neuen Testaments, Walter de Gruyter, Berlin, New York 1994, pp. 219 ff.  
  
 Seid, Timothy. "A Table of Greek Manuscripts" . Interpreting Ancient Manuscripts. Retrieved June 22, 2007. 
 Black M., Aland K., Die alten Übersetzungen des Neuen Testaments, die Kirchenväterzitate und Lektionare: der gegenwärtige Stand ihrer Erforschung und ihre Bedeutung für die griechische Textgeschichte, Wissenschaftliche Beirat des Instituts für neutestamentliche Textforschung, Berlin 1972.
 Carroll D. Osburn, The Greek Lectionaries of the New Testament, in. The Text of the New Testament in Contemporary Research, ed. Bart D. Ehrman and Michael W. Holmes, William B. Eerdmans Publishing Company, Grand Rapids 1995, pp. 61–74.

External links 
 International recording list for Greek manuscripts of the New Testament Continuation list, Institute for New Testament Textual Research (INTF), Munster
 "Continuation of the Manuscript List" INTF, University of Münster. Retrieved September 8, 2009
 
 Lectionaries at the Encyclopedia of Textual Criticism
 New Testament Lectionary Manuscripts

lectionaries
Greek New Testament manuscripts